Henry Clark (born 11 September 1934) was an English professional footballer who played as an inside forward for Sunderland.

References

1934 births
Living people
Footballers from Sunderland
English footballers
Association football inside forwards
Sunderland A.F.C. players
Blyth Spartans A.F.C. players
English Football League players